Pink Roses is an 1890 painting by Vincent van Gogh, one of his last works. It is now in the Ny Carlsberg Glyptotek, to which it was donated by Helga Jacobsen in 1923 - its catalogue number is MIN 1843. It was painted during the last two months of his life, May to July 1890, which he spent in Auvers-sur-Oise.

See also
List of works by Vincent van Gogh

References

External links

Paintings by Vincent van Gogh
1890 paintings
Flower paintings
Paintings in the collection of the Ny Carlsberg Glyptotek
19th-century paintings in Denmark